H. imbricata may refer to:
 Himantura imbricata, the scaly whipray, a skate species found in the tropical Indo-West Pacific oceans from the Red Sea and Mauritius to Indonesia
 Hydrostachys imbricata, a flowering plant species

See also
 Imbricata